The Smoky Mountain Opry Theater (formerly known as The Miracle Theater and Louise Mandrell Theater) is a theater established in 1997.

History
In Fall 1997, the theater was opened as stage for country singer Louise Mandrell. In 2005, the theater was purchased by The Fee Hedrick Family Entertainment Group, while Mandrell performed her last show on New Year's Eve that same year. After a $15 million installation, the theater was reopened as "The Miracle Theater" on April 13, 2006. Its main play, "The Miracle" was performed from its opening in 2006 to its closing on October 22, 2011. The musical was about the life of Jesus Christ. The musical consisted of live animals, sword-fights, and wire-harnessing angels and was composed by David Legg and written by Linda Nell Cooper. Other shows that were performed at the Miracle Theater included the Andrew Lloyd Webber musical, Joseph and the Amazing Technicolor Dreamcoat. In September 2007, the Miracle Theater received national attention when it spent about $90,000 on a USA Today advertisement, which indirectly criticized Kathy Griffin's Primetime Emmy Award acceptance speech. On November 7, 2011, the theater re-opened as "Smoky Mountain Opry Theater" with a "Christmas at the Opry" show. A variety show was also added in the beginning of the 2012 season. At the end of 2018, World Choice Investments, the owner of Dolly Parton's Stampede, purchased Fee Hedrick Entertainment (and therefore the Smoky Mountain Opry) for an undisclosed amount.

In May 2020, spokesperson Pete Owens announced that the theater would be closed during the entire season due to the COVID-19 pandemic. As of January 2023, the theater remains closed.

References

External links
 

1997 establishments in Tennessee
Christian plays
Impact of the COVID-19 pandemic on the arts and cultural heritage
Music venues in East Tennessee
Passion settings
Pigeon Forge, Tennessee
Stage portrayals of Jesus
Theatres completed in 1997
Tourist attractions in Sevier County, Tennessee
Variety shows